Far Hills is a NJ Transit station in Far Hills, in Somerset County, New Jersey, United States located at the intersection of Route 202 and CR 512,  east of Route 206.

History
The Spanish Revival-style station was built in 1914 and also includes an old freight station to the west in a similar design. The head house has been on the state and federal registers of historic places since 1984, listed as part of the Operating Passenger Railroad Stations Thematic Resource.

Station layout

In addition to the building with ticket office and waiting room, permitted parking is available, along with bicycle racks along the station house wall. There is one low-level concrete side platform. Near the station, there is a passing siding to allow east and westbound trains to get past each other.

The Far Hills station has a restaurant called Butler's Pantry and is part of the NJ Transit Gladstone Branch, offering service to Hoboken Terminal, and to Penn Station in Midtown Manhattan via the Kearny Connection. The station is also known as Far Hills–Bedminster because of its proximity to the town. During an earlier era, most riders would get off at the Far Hills station for the horse races at the Far Hills Steeplechase Farm.

See also
List of New Jersey Transit stations
National Register of Historic Places listings in Somerset County, New Jersey

References

External links

 Station from US 202 from Google Maps Street View

Far Hills, New Jersey
NJ Transit Rail Operations stations
Railway stations in the United States opened in 1890
Railway stations on the National Register of Historic Places in New Jersey
Railway stations in Somerset County, New Jersey
Former Delaware, Lackawanna and Western Railroad stations
National Register of Historic Places in Somerset County, New Jersey
1890 establishments in New Jersey